Hylsfjorden or Hylsfjord is a fjord in the municipality Suldal in Rogaland county, Norway. It ends just north of the village of Sand where it joins the Saudafjorden and together they form the Sandsfjorden, an inner branch of the Boknafjorden. The  Hylen Hydroelectric Power Station is located in the inner end of Hylsfjord. The fjord has relatively little development along its shores, only a few small hamlets, with Vanvik being the largest.

See also
 List of Norwegian fjords

References

Fjords of Rogaland
Suldal